The 1984–85 St. Francis Terriers men's basketball team represented St. Francis College during the 1984–85 NCAA Division I men's basketball season. The team was coached by Bob Valvano, who was in his first year at the helm of the St. Francis Terriers. The Terrier's home games were played at the  Generoso Pope Athletic Complex. The team has been a member of the Northeast Conference since 1981, although at this time the conference was known as the ECAC Metro Conference.

The Terriers finished their season at 7–21 overall and 3–11 in conference play. They played in the conference tournament with the 8th seed, but lost in the opening round to Marist.

Bob Valvano, at the time of his hiring, was the youngest coach in NCAA Division I men's basketball. He is the brother of Jim Valvano, who led NC State to an NCAA Tournament championship in 1983. Valvano was given a one-year $26,000 contract by St. Francis.

Magdi Ahamed, a freshman, was a member of the Sudan national basketball team.

Roster

Schedule and results

|-
!colspan=12 style="background:#0038A8; border: 2px solid #CE1126;;color:#FFFFFF;"| Regular season
 

 

 

|-
!colspan=12 style="background:#0038A8; border: 2px solid #CE1126;;color:#FFFFFF;"| ECAC Metro tournament

References

St. Francis Brooklyn Terriers men's basketball seasons
St. Francis
St. Francis Brooklyn Terriers men's basketball
St. Francis Brooklyn Terriers men's basketball